Siempre may refer to:

 Siempre (Il Divo album), 2006
 Siempre (Rocío Dúrcal album), 1986
 Siempre (Magneto album), 1996
 Siempre!, a Mexican political magazine